Lužice is a municipality and village in Most District in the Ústí nad Labem Region of the Czech Republic. It has about 600 inhabitants.

Administrative parts

The village of Svinčice is an administrative part of Lužice.

History
The first written mention of Lužice is from 1226, Svinčice is mentioned already in 1207. Existence of the Church of Saint Augustine is documented in the 14th century.

References

Villages in Most District